Expressway 25 may refer to the following roads in South Korea: 

 Honam Expressway : Suncheon, South Jeolla ~ Nonsan, South Chungcheong
 Nonsan–Cheonan Expressway : Nonsan, South Chungcheong ~ Cheonan, South Chungcheong